Xavier Norman Petermann is a Canadian former child actor from Quebec, who garnered a Genie Award nomination for Best Actor at the 6th Genie Awards for his performance as an autistic child in the film Mario. The film was his first-ever acting role.

Petermann continued to act in Quebec films and television series until the early 1990s. He has since worked as a musician and as a multimedia and video game developer.

References

External links

Canadian male child actors
Canadian male film actors
Canadian male television actors
Canadian video game designers
Male actors from Quebec
Living people
Year of birth missing (living people)